The JCW Heavyweight Championship is a professional wrestling world heavyweight championship in Juggalo Championship Wrestling. It was established in 1999 at JCW's first show, the taping for the DVD JCW Volume 1, with Evil Dead winning a 20-man battle royal. There have been a total of 15 recognized champions who have had a combined 22 official reigns.

Title history
Key

Combined reigns

See also
JCW Tag Team Championship

References

External links
 Official JCW website
 JCW Heavyweight Championship

Juggalo Championship Wrestling
Heavyweight wrestling championships